Hostile Takeover may refer to:
 Hostile takeover, the purchase of one business by another against the wishes of management
 Hostile Takeover Trilogy, a science fiction trilogy by S. Andrew Swann
 Hostile Takeover (album) by RBL Posse
 "Hostile Takeover" (Supergirl), an episode from the first season of Supergirl
 "Hostile Takeover" (CSI: Miami), an episode from the eighth season of CSI: Miami
 Hostile Takeover: How Islam Impedes Progress and Threatens Society, a 2018 book by Thilo Sarrazin
 Hostile Takeover: Resisting Centralized Government's Stranglehold on America, a 2012 book by Matt Kibbe

See also
Hostyle Takeover, a 2016 album by Hostyle Gospel
"Hostel Takeover", an episode from the seventh season of Hotel Impossible
Hostile Makeover, a 2009 television film
Takeover (disambiguation)